Originally established December 4, 1878 as the Select Committee on Epidemic Diseases. It became a standing committee on December 12, 1887 until March 19, 1896, when the name was changed to the Committee on Public Health and National Quarantine. Terminated April 18, 1921.

Chairmen

Select Committee on Epidemic Diseases 1878-1887
Isham Harris (D-TN) 1878-1887

Committee on Epidemic Diseases 1887-1896
Isham Harris (D-TN) 1887-1893
John P. Jones (R-NV) 1893-1895

Committee on Public Health and National Quarantine 1896-1921
George G. Vest (D-MO) 1896-1903
John T. Morgan (D-AL) 1903-1907
John W. Daniel (D-VA) 1908-1909
Thomas S. Martin (D-VA) 1909-1911
Charles A. Culberson (D-TX) 1911-1913
Joseph E. Ransdell (D-LA) 1913-1919
Joseph I. France (R-MD) 1919-1921

Sources 
Chairmen of Senate Standing Committees U.S. Senate Historical Office, January 2005.

Public Health and National Quarantine
Public health organizations
Organizations established in 1878
1921 disestablishments
Parliamentary committees on Healthcare